Susquenita School District is a midsized, public school district located in Perry County, Pennsylvania and also includes one township in Dauphin County, Pennsylvania. Susquenita School District encompasses the boroughs of Marysville, New Buffalo, and Duncannon. It also serves: Watts Township, Wheatfield Township, Penn Township, and Rye Township, as well as Reed Township in Dauphin County.

Susquenita School District operates three schools: Susquenita High School, Susquenita Middle School and Susquenita Elementary School.

Extracurricular
Susquenita School District offers a variety of clubs, activities and an extensive sports program.  Susquenita School District is a member of the Mid-Penn Conference for football, and the Tri-Valley League for all other sports and District III of PIAA.

The drama department was nominated for two Hershey Apollo awards (best pit band and best play) and won the award for 2011 best pit band.

Sports
The district funds:

Boys
Baseball - AAA
Basketball- AAAA
Cross Country - AA
Football - AAA
Soccer - AA
Track and Field - AA
Wrestling	 - AA

Girls
Basketball - AAA
Cross Country - A
Field Hockey - A
Soccer (Fall) - AA
Softball - AAA
Track and Field - AA

Junior high school sports

Boys
Basketball
Soccer
Wrestling	

Girls
Basketball
Field Hockey
Soccer (fall)

According to PIAA directory July 2012  By 2016 the school board eliminated tennis at the high school and junior high football.

References

External links
 

School districts in Dauphin County, Pennsylvania
Education in Dauphin County, Pennsylvania
School districts in Perry County, Pennsylvania
Education in Perry County, Pennsylvania
Susquehanna Valley
Education in Harrisburg, Pennsylvania